The khen is a mouth organ of Southeast Asia.

Khen may also refer to:

 Khen dynasty, a mediaeval dynasty of Assam, India
 Khen Lampert (born 1957), Israeli educator and philosopher
 Khen Shish (born 1970), Israeli artist
 Koo Luam Khen (born 1951), Malaysian football player
 Princha Khen, Bangladeshi freedom fighter
 Khen, Israeli DJ and music producer

See also 
 KHEN-LP, a radio station of Colorado, the US
 Chen (disambiguation)